Penn Wood High School is a high school that occupies two campuses. One in Lansdowne, Pennsylvania, USA, and one in Yeadon, Pennsylvania, USA.

Organization
Penn Wood High is managed by the William Penn School District.  The school serves the boroughs of Aldan, Colwyn, Darby, East Lansdowne, Lansdowne, and Yeadon.

The two campuses are Cypress Street Campus in Yeadon with the 9th grade, and the Green Avenue Campus with grades 10th, 11th,12th.

History
Penn Wood High School, originally Lansdowne High School, was opened in 1927. The architect was Joseph Linden Heacock, and the builder was John McShain who went on to build the Kennedy Center, The Jefferson Memorial and The Pentagon. Today, it is one of the oldest public school buildings in Pennsylvania. Built in the Italian Renaissance style, the motto carved above the door reads "To Teach the Art of Living Well", attributed to Seneca. Carved in limestone above the motto are a female figure holding a Greek Temple, and a male figure holding a cog. The School is officially a merger of 3 previous high schools: Lansdowne-Aldan High School, Yeadon High School and Darby-Colwyn High School.  Penn Wood's first year of existence as the new merger school was the 1982–83 school year. Their basketball team has recently won the PIAA Quad 4 State Championship against York High.

Notable alumni
 Darrell Hill, American Olympic shot put athlete, Rio 2016 
 Dawn Burrell, American Olympic athlete.
 Leroy Burrell, former American 100 meter world record holder.
 John Stanford, United States Army major general, Fulton County executive, and Seattle school district superintendent.
William M. Matz Jr., United States Army general, Vietnam War combat veteran, VP Raytheon, GM Northrop Grumman, President of NAUS.
John Rauch, Former NFL Head Coach of Oakland Raiders and Buffalo Bills
Peter J. Liacouras, Former President of Temple University
Rap Curry, former NIKE All-American basketball player and St Joe Hawk
Kurt Vile, Indie Musician
Harry Connolly (writer)

References

External links
 Cypress Street Campus
 Green Avenue Campus

Public high schools in Pennsylvania
Educational institutions established in 1927
Schools in Delaware County, Pennsylvania
1927 establishments in Pennsylvania
Lansdowne, Pennsylvania